Ngamo (also known as Ngamawa, Gamo, Gamawa) is an Afro-Asiatic language spoken in Nigeria. The native Ngamo language has two major dialects, viz, Gudi Ngamo and Yaya Ngamo. These dialects are spoken by the various clans both within and outside Gadaka.
Ngamo is a member of the West Branch of Chadic and is hence related to Hausa, the dominant language throughout northern Nigeria. Ngamo’s closest linguistic relatives are, however, its neighbors, Karekare, Bole, and Maka.

The Ethnologue gives a figure for 60,000 as the number of Ngamo speakers, which seems not unreasonable. The pre-eminent traditional ruler of the Ngamo people is Mai Gudi, Alhaji Isa Bunuwo, whose court is located in Gadaka, about 50 kilometers south of Potiskum.

There are two major dialects of Ngamo, the Gudi dialect and the Yaya dialect. The dialects are different enough from each other in phonology, morphology, and lexicon that they border on being separate languages, but there is fair mutual intelligibilty, which justifies grouping them as dialects of one language. The origin of the name “Ngamo” is not known. This root is used both as an autonym and by linguistic neighbors.

People	Ngoi Ngamo (m), An Ngamo (f)
Ngamaye (pl)	                        

Research on Ngamo

Research on Ngamo language has been conducted by the Yobe Languages Research Project. This project has been supported by two awards from the US National Science Foundation. The first, “The Chadic Languages of Yobe State, Nigeria” (award #BCS-0111289, Russell G. Schuh, Principal Investigator), ran from 2001-2004. The second, “Lexicon, Linguistic Structure, and Verbal Arts in Chadic Languages of Northeastern Nigeria” (award #BCS-0553222, Russell G. Schuh, Principal Investigator), ran from 2006-2009. Directors of the project under both grants are Russell G. Schuh, the Principal Investigator, and Alhaji Maina Gimba, the In-Country Director. From 2002-2004, members of the Ngamo team were Umaru Mamu Goge, Jibir Audu Janga Dole (both speakers of Gudi Ngamo), and Isa Adamu Gashinge (a speaker of Yaya Ngamo). Because of limitations of time and resources, it was decided for 2006-2009 to focus Ngamo research on the Gudi dialect, though some new data on Yaya Ngamo was collected in 2009, and more than half of the material in the 2009 collection of Ngamo verbal arts is in Yaya Ngamo. The members of the Ngamo team are Umaru Mamu Goge and Jibir Audu Janga Dole for Gudi, with Isa Adamu Gashinge providing Yaya data. Thanks go also to HRH Alhaji Isa Bunuwo, Mai Gudi for his support and to Madu Liman and his family for indispensable logistic support.

Notes

Further reading 
 Jibir Audu Janga Dole, Umaru Mamu Goge, and Isa Adamu Gashinge, 2009, Ngamo-English-Hausa Dictionary, Yobe Languages Research Project.

External links 
Ngamo language materials from UCLA
 

West Chadic languages
Languages of Nigeria